Kim Hong-il  (Hangul: 김홍일; Hanja: 金弘一; born 29 September 1987) is a South Korean footballer who currently plays for Suwon FC in K League Challenge.

Career statistics

External links 

1987 births
Living people
Association football midfielders
South Korean footballers
Suwon Samsung Bluewings players
Gwangju FC players
Gimcheon Sangmu FC players
Suwon FC players
K League 1 players
K League 2 players